Erigeron leioreades is an Asian species of flowering plants in the family Asteraceae. It grows in spruce forests and alpine meadows in Siberia, Xinjiang, and Kazakhstan.

Erigeron leioreades is a perennial, clump-forming herb up to 37 cm (15 inches) tall, forming underground rhizomes. Its flower heads have lilacray florets surrounding yellow disc florets.

References

leioreades
Flora of Asia
Plants described in 1940